Giovanni Rocca may refer to:

* Giovanni Antonio Rocca (1607–1656), Italian mathematician
 Giovanni Nasalli Rocca di Corneliano (1872–1952), Italian Cardinal of the Catholic Church
 Gianni Rocca (1929–2013), Italian sprinter
 Giovanni Rocca (engraver) (1788-1858)